{{DISPLAYTITLE:C19H29NO3}}
The molecular formula C19H29NO3 (molar mass: 319.44 g/mol, exact mass: 319.2147 u) may refer to:

 Dihydrotetrabenazine (DTBZ)
 Homocapsaicin

Molecular formulas